The Light That Failed is a 1939 drama film based on Rudyard Kipling's 1891 novel of the same name. It stars Ronald Colman as an artist who is going blind.

Plot
In 1865, youngster Dick Heldar is briefly blinded when his girlfriend Maisie accidentally fires his pistol too close to his head. She later tells him that her guardians are sending her away somewhere to be educated, but she agrees when he says she belongs to him "forever and ever."

Years later, Dick is a British soldier during the Mahdist War in Sudan. When the natives attack suddenly, he saves the life of his friend, war correspondent "Torp" Torpenhow, but receives a wound to the head as a result.

He turns to painting to try to make a living. When his works start to sell, he returns to England. His realistic paintings of scenes from the war become immensely popular with the critics and the public. In London, he moves in with Torp and is reunited with a grown-up Maisie, also a painter, though not as successful. Liking the financial rewards, Dick is persuaded to sanitize his gritty realism to make his works more attractive to the masses. Torp and fellow war correspondent "The Nilghai" try to warn him about it, but he pays no heed; he becomes complacent and lazy. Maisie decides to move away and stop seeing him.

One night, Dick returns to his lodgings to find a young, bedraggled woman lying on his sofa. Torp explains that she fainted from hunger outside, so he brought her in and fed her Dick's dinner. She bitterly gives her name as Bessie Broke. Dick becomes fascinated; she is the ideal model for Melancholia, a painting that Maisie had struggled to complete. He hires her to pose for him.

When his vision starts to blur, he goes to see a doctor who gives him a grim prognosis: as a result of his old war injury, he will go blind in a year if he avoids strain, "not very long" if he does not.

Before he completely loses his sight, Dick resolves to paint his masterpiece, Melancholia. He drinks heavily and drives Bessie to hysteria to evoke the desired expression. When Torp returns from his latest assignment, Dick tells him about his blindness and shows him the painting. While Dick sleeps, Bessie sneaks in and destroys it, unaware of his ailment. When he wakes up, he is blind. Torp tries to hide Bessie's act from Dick and sends for Maisie. When Dick shows her his masterpiece, she cannot bring herself to tell him it is ruined, and she leaves.

One day, while he is out on a walk, Dick's servant recognizes Bessie, and Dick invites her to his home. He shows her the balance in his bank book, proposes that she take care of him and kisses her. Realizing that he will learn the truth at some point, she confesses what she has done. As the news sinks in, he changes his plans.

Dick travels back to Sudan, where he wears his old uniform and hires a guide to take him to join Torp. They ride on horseback into the midst of a battle. Sensing that the British cavalry is about to deploy, Dick has Torp to direct him into the charge, where he is shot and killed by a native.

Cast
Ronald Colman as Dick Heldar
Walter Huston as Torpenhow
Muriel Angelus as Maisie
Ida Lupino as Bessie Broke
Dudley Digges as The Nilghai
Ernest Cossart as Beeton
Ferike Boros as Madame Binat, a friend in Port Said
Pedro de Cordoba as Monsieur Binat
Colin Tapley as Gardner
Ronald Sinclair as Dick (as a boy)
Sarita Wooton as Maisie (as a girl)
Halliwell Hobbes as Doctor
Charles Irwin as Soldier Model, who poses for one of Dick's paintings
Francis McDonald as George, the guide
George Regas as Cassavetti
Wilfred Roberts as Barton

Reception
Frank Nugent, critic for The New York Times, praised the film, calling it a "letter-perfect edition of Kipling's 'The Light That Failed'". He also lauded the star ("Mr. Colman has rarely handled a role with greater authority or charm"), Lupino ("Ida Lupino's Bessie is another of the surprises we get when a little ingenue suddenly bursts forth as a great actress.") and the rest of the principal actors.

Cinema murder
On May 29, 1946, in Bristol, England, cinema manager Robert Parrington Jackson was shot in his office during an evening showing of The Light That Failed. It was believed that the murder was timed to coincide with gunshots from the scene in which young Dick is blinded in order to obscure the sound of the murder gunshots. The murder remains unsolved to this day.

References

External links

 (Ignore inaccurate overview.)
The Light That Failed at AFI Catalog 

1939 films
1939 drama films
American drama films
American black-and-white films
1930s English-language films
Films about blind people
Films about fictional painters
Films about the Mahdist War
Films based on British novels
Films based on works by Rudyard Kipling
Films directed by William A. Wellman
Films scored by Victor Young
Films set in 1865
Films set in the 1880s
Films set in England
Films set in London
Films set in Sudan
Paramount Pictures films
1930s American films
Films about disability